John Hurley (2 June 1844 – 10 December 1911) was a politician in colonial Australia, a member at different times of the New South Wales Legislative Assembly and the Queensland Legislative Assembly.

Harley was born in Sydney, the son of Farrell Hurley and Catherine ( Critchley)

Hurley was member of the New South Wales Legislative Assembly for Central Cumberland 22 February 1872 to 28 November 1874; for Hartley 21 April 1876 to 9 November 1880, 12 February 1887 to 6 June 1891 and 3 July 1901 to 19 August 1907. He did not hold caucus, parliamentary or ministerial office.

Hurley was also member of the Queensland Legislative Assembly for Maryborough 17 August 1883 to 8 July 1884.

His brother William was also a member of the NSW parliament, as member for Macquarie (1895–1904) and the Legislative Council (1904-1924).

References

 

1844 births
1911 deaths
Members of the New South Wales Legislative Assembly
Members of the Queensland Legislative Assembly
Politicians from Sydney